The Romney, formerly called the Romney Marsh sheep but generally referred to by the local farmers as the Kent, is a breed of sheep originating in England. The Romney is a "long-wool" breed recognized in England by 1800. Exported to other continents, the Romney is an economically important sheep breed, especially to the sheep-meat and wool export trades of New Zealand.

History of the breed

Origins
The breed evolved from medieval longwool types of which the Romney and Leicester breeds are early examples. The sheep recognized by 1800 as "Romney Marsh" or "Kent" were improved in body type and fleece quality through crossings with Bakewell's English Leicester.

International spread
The first confirmed export of Romneys from England was a shipment of 20 from Stone, Kent, that went on the Cornwall to New Zealand in 1853. With these and a further 30 ewes sent in 1856, Alfred Ludlum established New Zealand's first Romney Marsh stud in 1860 at Newry, in the Hutt Valley, and Ludlam's brother-in-law, Augustus Onslow Manby Gibbes, also bred them around this time in Australia at his famous sheep property, Yarralumla.

In 1855, 60,000 Merinos had been in New Zealand, but the Romney Marsh sheep thrived more quickly, supplanting the Merino over most of the country. The New Zealand Romney Marsh Association was formed in 1904. Alfred Matthews was the first president; the stud he founded, Waiorongamai, is still going.

In 1965, three-quarters of the New Zealand national flock was Romney.

In the mid-1990s, Romneys comprised 58% of the New Zealand sheep flock (estimated in 2000 at 45 million), with Coopworths (originally Border Leicester on Romney crosses) and Perendales (originally Cheviot on Romney crosses) making up another 16.6%, Merinos 7%, and Corriedales 5.5% of the national flock.

The New Zealand export lamb trade started in 1882 with a shipment aboard the Dunedin of 4,900 frozen carcasses to London's Smithfield Market. This was by far the biggest meat cargo ever carried over such a distance to that time. February 15, the departure date, is still celebrated as New Zealand Lamb Day. After 1932, the technology for shipping chilled fresh meat by sea (and later by air) further enhanced the export trade.

The breeding of Romneys is not limited to England and New Zealand. The breed has also been established in Patagonia, Australia, Portugal, Brazil, Canada, and Southern California.

For many years, England was the primary source of export Romneys. Between 1900 and 1955, 18,000 rams and 9,000 ewes went from England to 43 countries. New Zealand itself began exporting after the sensational win of Ernest Short's Parorangi ram at the Argentine International Exhibition in 1906. Health requirements in recent decades have made New Zealand and Australia almost the only breeding ground for exported Romney seed stock, with Brazil, Uruguay, the Falklands, the U.S., and England, itself, some of the recipient countries.

Description

Attributes
The Romney is not the ideal breed for every situation. Henry Fell, in Intensive Sheep Management posits that the Romney is, “A breed which ha[s] all the virtues save one, that of prolificacy… will thrive happily at extraordinary densities and seems to enjoy it.” A number of large Romney flocks in New Zealand have in the last several decades achieved better than 1.7 lambs for every ewe exposed to the ram, showing much better prolificacy than Fell had observed in England. Some leaders are going yet higher, still with good survivability.

Almost every detailed description of the Romney cites relative resistance to foot rot, an attribute rarely mentioned in descriptions of other breeds. “It is said that foot rot and liver fluke seldom affect Romney Marsh sheep.” reads a 1918 American text. A later book is more circumspect: “Romneys are said to be somewhat resistant to foot rot, liver flukes and other problems that often plague sheep in damp pastures.”

Appearance
The Romney is in general an open-faced breed with long wool that grows over the legs in full. Romney breed standards are not identical across all countries, but have much in common. The oldest Romney breed society, that of England (founded 1895), adopted the following standard in 1991, The Official Description of the typical Romney sheep is as follows: Head wide, level between ears, with no horns nor dark hair on the poll. Eyes should be large, bright and prominent and the mouth sound. Face in ewes full, and in rams broad and masculine in appearance. Nose and hooves should be black. Neck well set in at the shoulders, strong and not too long. Shoulders well put in and level with the back. Chest wide and deep. Back straight and long, with a wide and deep loin. Rump wide, long and well-turned. Tail set almost even with the chine . Thighs well let down and developed. The face should be white, and the skin of a clean pink colour. Ribs should be well sprung. Legs well set, with good bone and sound feet. Sheep should stand well on their pasterns. The fleece should be of white colour, even texture and a good decided staple from top of head to end of tail and free from kemp. A Romney may have either a colored or white fleece.

Today's Romney sheep varies among and also within continents, especially as to body size. The breed can still be characterized in that respect as being in the larger half of the spectrum represented say by Cheviot (smaller end) to Lincoln (larger end). An English description of size speaks of “big sheep”—ewes, to 85 kg, rams to 110 kg, while the American breed standard calls for ewes at breeding age to be “140 lbs or more” and rams “200 lbs or more.”

The registering bodies for most sheep breeds continue to struggle with the question of what size is just right and with other finer details. These questions have no transnational or even national answers. Relevant issues include economics, ecology, and the exigencies (in some countries) of the show ring.

Fleece characteristics
Romneys produce a heavy fleece. A healthy mature ram can yield at shearing upwards of 10 kg per year, while flock averages in NZ for breeding ewes are typically above 5 kg. The increased fleece weight of a long-wooled sheep comes from the longer fiber length produced. A finer-wooled sheep (e.g. Merino, Rambouillet) actually has far more wool follicles than the long-wooled sheep, but each supports a slower-growing fiber that is, therefore, shorter at periodic shearing. The “clean yield” (net weight after thorough washing) is typically high for Romneys, 75-80%; this is a higher yield than is got for most fine-wooled sheep.

Perhaps the most important dimension of wool, which above all else determines its best use, is average fiber diameter (AFD). Romneys are strong-wooled sheep, with an AFD higher than many sheep breeds. High AFD indicates best use in carpeting and other rugged uses; lowest AFD wools (from Merinos, for example) are ideal for fine suit fabrics and luxury wear. AFD must be measured with instruments. The time-honored “Bradford system”, which uses the eyes and hands of experienced humans, has some correlation to measured AFD, but can be biased. The American Romney Breeders Association declares the Romney fleece should be [Bradford system] “44s to 50s.” Transformed arbitrarily into microns by the United States Department of Agriculture this range would correspond to 29.30 to 36.19 microns. In New Zealand the standard says “44s to 52s” but gives a different AFD range: 33 to 37 microns. No international agreement exists on converting Bradford counts into AFD in microns.

The Romney's fleece is ideal for hand-spinning, and is often recommended to beginners. In the United States, where no commercial end-use for domestic strong wools exists, the most desired outlet for Romney wool is to hand-spinners. Only a small fraction of the thousands of Romney fleeces shorn in the US each year, however, go to this “niche-market” use.

Romney wool in NZ goes mostly into that country's vast shipments of wool for the rug and carpet factories of the European Union, Asia, the US, Australia, and NZ itself. An increasing amount recently has been going to China. New Zealand is the world's largest producer and exporter of “strong crossbred” wool (a term for wool with average fiber diameter >35.4 microns). In 2002–2003, the country exported about 138,000 tonnes of wool "clean basis", about half of which was of AFD >35.4 microns, the Romney domain. "Clean basis" refers to the net weight anticipated after thorough washing (see "clean yield" above); much wool moved internationally is shipped before washing as the natural oils in the fleece make it travel better. In the same year, total wool exports returned nearly NZ$ one billion, about 3% of total merchandise exports revenues for the country.

In North America and England, natural-colored Romneys (whose fleeces are not white, but black, gray, silver, variegated) have come to be valued for what they bring to hand-spinners and weavers who like the palette of natural colors. Traditionally, natural-colored (or “black”) sheep were detested, as even a small amount of black fiber on an otherwise white sheep can ruin hundreds of pounds of textile.

Since 1972, natural-colored Romneys have been registered with the American Romney Breeders’ Association (founded 1911), which has developed a special breed standard for them. In New Zealand natural colored Romneys can be registered in the Romney section of the Black and Natural-colored Sheep Breeders Association, but are still eyed with suspicion by many breeders of white Romneys.

Economic importance
The sheer number of Romney ewes and lambs in New Zealand make the breed not only the biggest input by tonnage to overseas and domestic wool trade, but also the major part of the country's export frozen lamb trade, as purebreds and first-generation crosses. New Zealand is the world's largest exporter of frozen and chilled lamb. In 2008, NZ sheep-meat exports (mostly of lamb) brought in more than half of the country's NZ$4.5 billion meat export revenues.

See also

Bradford system
Sheep shearing
Wool classing

References

External links
 The Romney Sheep Breeders Society
 American Romney Breeders Association
 North American Romney Association

Sheep breeds
Sheep breeds originating in England